The 2004 WNBA season was the 8th season for the San Antonio Silver Stars franchise. The team came last in the league with a 9-25 record.

Offseason

Dispersal Draft
Based on the Silver Stars' 2003 record, they would pick 3rd in the Cleveland Rockers dispersal draft. The Silver Stars picked LaToya Thomas.

WNBA Draft

Regular season

Season standings

Season schedule

Player stats
Note: GP = Games played; REB = Rebounds; AST = Assists; STL = Steals; BLK = Blocks; PTS = Points

References

San Antonio Stars seasons
San Antonio